Samraong Commune is a khum (commune) in Tram Kak District, Takéo Province, Cambodia.

Administration 
As of 2019, Samraong Commune has 16 phums (villages) as follows.

References 

Communes of Takéo province
Tram Kak District